Jardín Botánico (Spanish for botanical garden) may refer to one of a number of sites. Relevant Wikipedia articles include:
 Buenos Aires Botanical Garden, Buenos Aires, Argentina (Jardín Botánico Carlos Thays de la Ciudad Autónoma de Buenos Aires)
 Real Jardín Botánico de Madrid, Madrid, Spain
 Mehan Garden, Manila, Philippines
 Botanical Garden of Mérida, Mérida, Venezuela (Centro Jardín Botánico de Mérida)
 Jardín Botánico (Distrito Nacional), sector of Santo Domingo, Dominican Republic
 contains the Dr. Rafael Ma. Moscoso National Botanical Garden